Kiwaia pumila is a moth in the family Gelechiidae. It is endemic to New Zealand.  It is classified as Nationally Vulnerable by the Department of Conservation.

Taxonomy 
This species was described by Alfred Philpott in 1928 and named Gelechia pumila. Philpott used specimens collected by Stuart Lindsay in Yaldhurst in May. George Vernon Hudson discussed and illustrated the species in 1939. In 1987 Klaus Siegfried Oskar Sattler placed this species in the genus Kiwaia. The type specimen is held at the Canterbury Museum.

Description 
Philpott described the species as follows:

Distribution 
K. pumila is endemic to New Zealand. Its range covers Marlborough, Mackenzie country and mid Canterbury. As well as the type locality of Yaldhurst, specimens have been collected at Clarence Bridge and Lake Pukaki, as well as on McLeans Island in Christchurch.

Life cycle and habitat 
Adult moths are on the wing in March. The species is associated with damp patches in grass habitat.

Host plants 
The host plant for this species is unknown.

Conservation Status 
This species has the "Nationally Vulnerable" conservation status under the New Zealand Threat Classification System.

References

Kiwaia
Moths described in 1928
Moths of New Zealand
Endemic fauna of New Zealand
Endangered biota of New Zealand
Endemic moths of New Zealand